The Princess Diaries Volume III: Princess in Love (released in the United Kingdom as Princess Diaries: Third Time Lucky) is a young adult book in the Princess Diaries series.  Written by Meg Cabot, it was released in 2001 by Harper Collins Publishers and is the third book in the series.

Plot Summary
In this volume, Mia struggles to decide how to break up with her boyfriend Kenny. In The Princess Diaries, Volume II: Princess in the Spotlight Kenny, Mia's biology partner at school, sent anonymous love letters to Mia expressing his feelings for her, resulting in Mia and Kenny dating. Mia does not love Kenny, but cannot bring herself to break up with him. Mia likes Michael, her friend Lilly's older brother, and feels she is leading Kenny on.

Mia also struggles to support Lilly, who organises a school-wide walkout of class as a protest against authority after her English teacher shoots down her paper proposal for her English final, titled "How to Survive High School." Not wanting to upset Mr. Gianni, Mia pulls the fire alarm at the time the walkout is scheduled to happen, though nobody finds out it was her. After Grand-mère and Sebastino, Mia's dress designer, publish a set of photos of Mia modelling different gowns without her or her parents' consent, Mia organises a press conference donating all the proceeds from the sales of the dresses she modelled to Greenpeace.

Mia begins to send Michael anonymous love letters, similar to that of Kenny's. Unknown to her, Mia's friend Tina, whom Mia confided in about the letters, has told Lilly about said letters. Lilly eventually tells Michael that it was Mia sending the letters. At the school Winter Carnival, Michael shows her a message on his computer revealing he knows she sent the love letters, and he returns her feelings.

Mia, not knowing how to respond and thinking Michael may be playing a joke on her, runs from her chair. Mia runs into Kenny, who mistakenly believes Mia is in love with Boris, and they break up. Mia returns home, is devastated and does not want to go to the dance following the carnival, and decides to move to Genovia. Mia's grandmother convinces her to go to the dance, where Mia sees Michael, and they share their first kiss together.

2002 American novels
American young adult novels

The Princess Diaries novels
HarperCollins books